The 1924 European Rowing Championships were rowing championships held on Lake Zürich in the Swiss city of Zürich. The competition was for men only and they competed in six of the seven Olympic boat classes (M1x, M2x, M2-, M2+, M4+, M8+) as they had been rowed earlier in the summer at the 1924 Summer Olympics in Paris; the new Olympic boat class of coxless four (M4-) was also part of the European Rowing Championships, but the only competitor would be Switzerland and they didn't want to win the European championship by row-over. It was the first time that the coxless pair boat class was part of the regatta.

Medal summary

Footnotes

References

European Rowing Championships
European Rowing Championships
Rowing
Rowing
Sport in Zürich